Alexander Gordon of Auchintoul (–July 1752) was a Scottish general who fought in the Russian army under Peter the Great in 1696–1711, and for the Jacobites in the Jacobite rising of 1715.

He is mentioned as "Sandy Don" in the song Cam Ye O'er Frae France.

He wrote a history of Peter the Great, including a brief account of his own life, which was published in Aberdeen in 1755 and in Leipzig in 1765. It is now available online.

References

1670 births
1752 deaths
Scottish generals